The Monument to North Carolina Women of the Confederacy was installed in Raleigh, North Carolina, United States in 1914. It was located in the surrounds of the North Carolina State Capitol, until its removal on June 21, 2020, during the protests following the murder of George Floyd.

See also
 List of monuments and memorials removed during the George Floyd protests

References

External links

 

1914 establishments in North Carolina
1914 sculptures
Monuments and memorials in the United States removed during the George Floyd protests
Buildings and structures in Raleigh, North Carolina
Confederate States of America monuments and memorials in North Carolina
Monuments and memorials to women
Outdoor sculptures in North Carolina
Removed Confederate States of America monuments and memorials
Sculptures of children in the United States
Sculptures of women in North Carolina